British air charter tour company Palmair served the following destinations at the time of its demise:

References

Lists of airline destinations